Paluküla may refer to several places in Estonia:

Paluküla, Hiiu County, village in Pühalepa Parish, Hiiu County
Paluküla, Rapla County, village in Kehtna Parish, Rapla County
Paluküla, Tartu County, village in Haaslava Parish, Tartu County